Jean Dufresne (14 February 1829 – 13 April 1893) was a German chess player and chess composer. He was a student of Adolf Anderssen, to whom he lost the "Evergreen game" in 1852.

Life
Dufresne was born and died in Berlin. The son of a wealthy Jewish businessman, he attended law school but was forced to abandon his studies when his father ran into financial difficulties. He subsequently became a journalist.

Dufresne was an unsuccessful novelist under the anagrammatic pseudonym E. S. Freund, but wrote several chess books, one of which, Kleines Lehrbuch des Schachspiels (1881, known in Germany as Der Kleine Dufresne) ran to many editions and taught several generations of players. In a letter to Paul Dirac at the end of 1929, Werner Heisenberg deemed Dufresne's handbook "the best book about theory of Chess". He also wrote a popular book on Paul Morphy.

His grave is located in the Jewish Cemetery Berlin-Weißensee.

Notable games

Dufresne took first in the Berliner Schachgesellschaft in 1853 and won an 1854 match against Carl Mayet (+7−5), a member of the Berlin Pleiades. Although he had a negative record against Anderssen, he had a plus record against Daniel Harrwitz, who in turn had a plus record against Anderssen.  Here is his win against Harrwitz in Berlin in 1848:

See also 
 List of chess games

References

External links

1829 births
1893 deaths
19th-century German Jews
German chess players
Jewish chess players
German chess writers
Chess composers
German male non-fiction writers
Writers from Berlin
19th-century chess players